Gohelwar was one of the four prants or traditional provinces of Saurashtra, the others being Jhalawar or Jhalavad, Halar, and Sorath.
 
Gohelwar covered the southeast of the Kathiawar peninsula, and roughly corresponds to the modern Bhavnagar District and Amreli District.

Princely states

Its salute states were :
First Class: Bhavnagar (entitled to a hereditary 13-guns salute and a 15-guns local salute, with the King titled Maharaja)
Second Class: Palitana (entitled to a hereditary 9-guns salute, with the King titled Thakur Sahib)

The major non-salute states included:
Third Class: Jasdan, Vala
Fourth Class: Lathi
Fifth Class: none
Sixth Class: Bhadli, Itaria, Kotra Pitha, Limbda, Vankia
Seventh Class: Kariana

Several more princely estates and states existed in this region, however, they would typically own only one or two villages.

External links
 Imperial Gazetteer, on dsal.uchicago.edu - Kathiawar

Districts of British India
Gohils